"A Fine, Fine Day" is a single released by American singer and keyboardist Tony Carey. It is the opening track on his 1984 album, Some Tough City.

The song, written by Carey, spent 15 weeks on the Billboard Hot 100, peaking at #22. It is Carey's highest charting single and one of two to make the top-40, with the other being "The First Day of Summer." It also peaked at #1 on the Top Tracks chart.

Critical reception
The song received generally positive reviews. Jim Angell of the Tri City Herald said, "there's no doubt A Fine, Fine Day...is a fine, fine song," while  the Chicago Tribune called it a "powerful hit." Saw Tek Meng of the New Straits Times called it "a fine opener [to Some Tough City]."

References

1984 singles
American rock songs
1984 songs
MCA Records singles